The 26th Mieczysław Połukard Criterium of Polish Speedway League Aces was the 2007 version of the Mieczysław Połukard Criterium of Polish Speedway Leagues Aces. It took place on April 1 in the Polonia Stadium in Bydgoszcz, Poland.

Starting positions draw 

 Krzysztof Buczkowski - Polonia Bydgoszcz
 Michał Szczepaniak - Polonia Bydgoszcz
 Wiesław Jaguś - Unibax Toruń
 Sebastian Ułamek - Złomrex-Włókniarz Częstochowa
  Andreas Jonsson - Polonia Bydgoszcz
 Jacek Krzyżaniak - GTŻ Grudziądz
 Paweł Hlib - Stal Gorzów Wlkp.
 Krzysztof Kasprzak - Unia Leszno
 Rafał Okoniewski - Polonia Bydgoszcz
  Matej Ferjan - Stal Gorzów Wlkp.
 Grzegorz Walasek - ZKŻ Kronopol Zielona Góra
 Krzysztof Jabłoński - Lotos Gdańsk
 Adrian Gomólski - Start Gniezno
 Mariusz Staszewski - Polonia Bydgoszcz
 Rafał Szombierski - RKM Rybnik
 Adrian Miedziński - Unibax Toruń
 Marcin Jędrzejewski - Polonia Bydgoszcz
 Krystian Klecha - Polonia Bydgoszcz

Note: riders in bold type was Polonia' riders.

Heat details

Notes

Sources 
 Roman Lach - Polish Speedway Almanac

See also 

Criterium of Aces
Mieczysław Połukard Criterium of Polish Speedway Leagues Aces